National Route 430 is a national highway of Japan connecting Kurashiki, Okayama and Tamano, Okayama in Japan, with a total length of 38.9 km (24.17 mi).

References

National highways in Japan
Roads in Okayama Prefecture